Shristi Shrestha, is a Nepalese model, actress, and the winner of the Miss Nepal World 2012 pageant. She works in Nepali cinema.

Career

Miss Nepal 
Shrestha represented her hometown of Chitwan during the Miss Nepal 2012 beauty pageant as Miss Chitwan 2012. She went on to win the main title of Miss Nepal World 2012 along with the Miss Confidence title. 

Shrestha is the first Miss Nepal to reach the quarter-finals of Miss World in which she finished in 20th place while achieving the eighth position in Beach Beauty, and was one of the top 10 contestants for the Multimedia Award. She also won the 'Public Choice award''' during the Miss World pageant.

Acting
The play was organised by the British Council, and directed by Gregory Thomson.

Shrestha has received several awards including National Film Award, Kamana Film Award, and D Cine Award.

Personal life 
Shrestha is the seventh Young Conservation Ambassador in WWF Nepal. Shristi is involved with Snow Leopard conservation projects at WWF Nepal.
Since 2016, she has been in a relationship with Saugat Malla.

Filmography

Music video

Films

References

External links
 

Living people
Miss World 2012 delegates
Miss Nepal winners
Nepalese female models
Nepalese beauty pageant winners
People from Chitwan District
1989 births
Nepalese film actresses
Actresses in Nepali cinema
Nepalese web series actresses
Actresses in Hindi cinema
Nepalese expatriate actresses in India
21st-century Nepalese actresses